Francis Gary Powers (August 17, 1929 – August 1, 1977) was an American pilot whose Central Intelligence Agency (CIA) Lockheed U-2 spy plane was shot down while flying a reconnaissance mission in Soviet Union airspace, causing the 1960 U-2 incident.

He later worked as a helicopter pilot for KNBC in Los Angeles and died in a 1977 helicopter crash.

Early life and education
Powers was born August 17, 1929, in Jenkins, Kentucky, the son of Oliver Winfield Powers (1904–1970), a coal miner, and his wife Ida Melinda Powers (1905–1991).  His family eventually moved to Pound, Virginia, just across the state border. He was the second born and only male of six children.

His family lived in a mining town, and because of the hardships associated with living in such a town, his father wanted Powers to become a physician. He hoped his son would achieve the higher earnings of such a profession and felt that this would involve less hardship than any job in his hometown.

Education and service
Graduating with a bachelor's degree from Milligan College in Tennessee in June 1950, he enlisted in the United States Air Force in October. He was commissioned as a second lieutenant in December 1952 after completing his advanced training with USAF Pilot Training Class 52-H at Williams Air Force Base, Arizona. Powers was then assigned to the 468th Strategic Fighter Squadron at Turner Air Force Base, Georgia, as a Republic F-84 Thunderjet pilot.

He married Barbara Gay Moore in Newnan, Georgia, on April 2, 1955.

In January 1956 he was recruited by the CIA. In May 1956 he began U-2 training at Watertown Strip, Nevada. His training was complete by August 1956 and his unit, the Second Weather Observational Squadron (Provisional) or Detachment 10-10, was deployed to Incirlik Air Base, Turkey. By 1960, Powers was already a veteran of many covert aerial reconnaissance missions. Family members believed that he was a NASA weather reconnaissance pilot.

The U-2 incident

Powers was discharged from the Air Force in 1956 with the rank of captain. He then joined the CIA's U-2 program at the civilian grade of GS-12. The U-2 was equipped with a state-of-the-art camera designed to take high-resolution photos from the stratosphere over hostile countries, including the Soviet Union. U-2 missions systematically photographed military installations and other important sites.

Reconnaissance mission
The primary mission of the U-2s was overflying the Soviet Union. Soviet intelligence had been aware of encroaching U-2 flights at least since 1958 if not earlier but lacked effective countermeasures until 1960. On May 1, 1960, Powers's U-2A, 56-6693, departed from a military airbase in Peshawar, Pakistan, with support from the U.S. Air Station at Badaber (Peshawar Air Station). This was to be the first attempt "to fly all the way across the Soviet Union ... but it was considered worth the gamble. The planned route would take us deeper into Russia than we had ever gone, while traversing important targets never before photographed."

Shot down
Powers was shot down by an S-75 Dvina (SA-2 "Guideline") surface-to-air missile over Sverdlovsk. A total of 14 Dvinas were launched, one of which hit a MiG-19 jet fighter which was sent to intercept the U-2 but could not reach a high enough altitude. Its pilot, Sergei Safronov, ejected but died of his injuries. Another Soviet aircraft, a newly manufactured Su-9 on a transit flight, also attempted to intercept Powers's U-2. The unarmed Su-9 was directed to ram the U-2, but missed because of the large differences in speed.

As Powers flew near Kosulino in the Ural Region, three S-75 Dvinas were launched at his U-2, with the first one hitting the aircraft. "What was left of the plane began spinning, only upside down, the nose pointing upward toward the sky, the tail down toward the ground." Powers was unable to activate the camera's self-destruct mechanism before he was thrown out of the plane after releasing the canopy and his seat belt. 
According to his own book Operation Overflight, it was a misunderstanding that the whole plane could be blown up.
While descending under his parachute, Powers had time to scatter his escape map, and rid himself of part of his suicide device, a silver dollar coin suspended around his neck containing a poison-laced injection pin, though he kept the poison pin. "Yet I was still hopeful of escape."  He hit the ground hard, was immediately captured, and taken to Lubyanka Prison in Moscow. Powers did note a second chute after landing on the ground, "some distance away and very high, a lone red and white parachute".

Attempted deception by the U.S. government
When the U.S. government learned of Powers's disappearance over the Soviet Union, they lied that a "weather plane" had strayed off course after its pilot had "difficulties with his oxygen equipment". What CIA officials did not realize was that the plane crashed almost fully intact and that the Soviets had recovered its pilot and the plane's equipment, including its top-secret high-altitude camera. Powers was interrogated extensively by the KGB for months before he made a confession and a public apology for his part in espionage.

Portrayal in U.S. media
Following admission by the White House that Powers had been captured alive, American media depicted Powers as an all-American pilot hero, who never smoked or touched alcohol. In fact, Powers smoked and drank socially. The CIA urged that his wife Barbara be given sedatives before speaking to the press and gave her talking points that she repeated to the press to portray her as a devoted wife. Her broken leg, according to the CIA disinformation, was the result of a water-skiing accident, when in fact it happened after she had had too much to drink and was dancing with another man.

In the course of his trial for espionage in the Soviet Union, Powers confessed to the charges against him and apologized for violating Soviet airspace to spy on the Soviets. In the wake of his apology, American media often depicted Powers as a coward and even as a symptom of the decay of America's "moral character."

Pilot testimony compromised by newspaper reports
Powers tried to limit the information he shared with the KGB to that which could be determined from the remains of his plane's wreckage. He was hampered by information appearing in the western press. A KGB major stated "there's no reason for you to withhold information. We'll find it out anyway. Your Press will give it to us." However, he limited his divulging of CIA contacts to one individual, with a pseudonym of "Collins".

Political consequence
The incident set back talks between Khrushchev and Eisenhower. Powers's interrogations ended on June 30, and his solitary confinement ended on July 9. On August 17, 1960, his trial began for espionage before the military division of the Supreme Court of the USSR. Lieutenant General Borisoglebsky, Major General Vorobyev, and Major General Zakharov presided. Roman Rudenko acted as prosecutor in his capacity of Procurator General of the Soviet Union.  Mikhail I. Grinev served as Powers's defense counsel. In attendance were his parents and sister, and his wife Barbara and her mother. His father brought along his attorney Carl McAfee, while the CIA provided two additional attorneys.

Conviction
On August 19, 1960, Powers was convicted of espionage, "a grave crime covered by Article 2 of the Soviet Union's law 'On Criminality Responsibility for State Crimes'".  His sentence consisted of 10 years' confinement, three of which were to be in a prison, with the remainder in a labor camp. The US Embassy "News Bulletin" stated, according to Powers, "as far as the government was concerned, I had acted in accordance with the instructions given me and would receive my full salary while imprisoned".

His cellmate was Zigurds Krūmiņš, a Latvian political prisoner. Powers kept a diary and a journal while confined. Additionally, he learned carpet weaving from his cellmate to pass the time. He could send and receive a limited number of letters to and from his family. The prison now contains a small museum with an exhibit on Powers, who allegedly developed a good rapport with Soviet prisoners there. Some pieces of the plane and Powers's uniform are on display at the Monino Airbase museum near Moscow.

Prisoner exchange

CIA opposition to exchange
The CIA, in particular, chief of CIA Counterintelligence James Jesus Angleton, opposed exchanging Powers for Soviet KGB Colonel William Fisher, known as "Rudolf Abel", who had been caught by the FBI and tried and jailed for espionage. First, Angleton believed that Powers may have deliberately  defected to the Soviet side. CIA documents released in 2010 indicate that U.S. officials did not believe Powers' account of the incident at the time, because it was contradicted by a classified National Security Agency (NSA) report which alleged that the U-2 had descended from  before changing course and disappearing from radar. The NSA report remains classified as of 2022.

In any event, Angleton suspected that Powers had already revealed all he knew to the Soviets and he reasoned, therefore, that Powers was worthless to the U.S. On the other hand, according to Angleton, William Fisher had yet revealed little to the CIA, refusing to disclose even his real name, and for this reason, William Fisher was still of potential value.

However, Barbara Powers, the wife of Gary Powers, was often drinking and allegedly having affairs. On June 22, 1961, she was pulled over by the police after driving erratically and was caught driving under the influence. To avoid bad publicity for the wife of the well-known CIA operative, doctors tasked by the CIA to keep Barbara out of the limelight arranged to have her committed to a psychiatric ward in Augusta, Georgia, under strict supervision. She was eventually released to the care of her mother. However, the CIA feared that Gary Powers languishing in Soviet prison might learn of Barbara's plight and as a result reach a state of desperation causing him to reveal to the Soviets whatever secrets he had not already revealed. Thus, Barbara unwittingly may have aided the cause of the approval of the prisoner exchange involving her husband and William Fisher. Angleton and others at the CIA still opposed the exchange but President John F. Kennedy approved it.

The exchange
On February 10, 1962, Powers was exchanged, along with U.S. student Frederic Pryor, for Soviet KGB Colonel Rudolf Abel. Due to political differences between the Soviet Union and the German Democratic Republic at the time, Pryor was turned over to American authorities at Checkpoint Charlie, before the exchange of Powers for Fisher was allowed to proceed on the Glienicke Bridge.

Powers credited his father with the swap idea. When released, Powers' total time in captivity was 1 year, 9 months, and 10 days.

Aftermath

Powers initially received a cold reception on his return home. He was criticized for not activating his aircraft's self-destruct charge to destroy the camera, photographic film, and related classified parts. He was also criticized for not using a CIA-issued "suicide pill" to kill himself (a coin with shellfish toxin embedded in its grooves, revealed during CIA testimony to the Church Committee in 1975).

He was debriefed extensively by the CIA, Lockheed Corporation, and the Air Force, after which a statement was issued by CIA director John McCone that "Mr. Powers lived up to the terms of his employment and instructions in connection with his mission and in his obligations as an American." On March 6, 1962, he appeared before a Senate Armed Services Select Committee hearing chaired by Senator Richard Russell Jr. which included Senators Prescott Bush, Leverett Saltonstall, Robert Byrd, Margaret Chase Smith, John Stennis, Strom Thurmond, and Barry Goldwater. During the hearing, Senator Saltonstall stated, "I commend you as a courageous, fine young American citizen who lived up to your instructions and who did the best you could under very difficult circumstances."  Senator Bush declared, "I am satisfied he has conducted himself in exemplary fashion and in accordance with the highest traditions of service to one's country, and I congratulate him upon his conduct in captivity."  Senator Goldwater sent him a handwritten note: "You did a good job for your country."

Divorce and remarriage

Powers sued his wife for divorce on August 14 1962, claming she cursed and abused him for no reason  Powers stated that the reasons for the divorce included her infidelity and alcoholism, adding that she constantly threw tantrums and overdosed on pills shortly after his return. He started a relationship with Claudia Edwards "Sue" Downey, whom he had met while working briefly at CIA Headquarters. Downey had a child, Dee, from her previous marriage. They were married on October 26, 1963. Their son Francis Gary Powers Jr. was born on June 5, 1965. The marriage proved to be a very happy one, and Sue worked hard to preserve her husband's legacy after his death.

Praise
During a speech in March 1964, former CIA Director Allen Dulles said of Powers, "He performed his duty in a very dangerous mission and he performed it well, and I think I know more about that than some of his detractors and critics know, and I am glad to say that to him tonight."

Later career
Powers worked for Lockheed as a test pilot from 1962 to 1970, though the CIA paid his salary. In 1970, he wrote the book Operation Overflight with co-author Curt Gentry. Lockheed fired him, because "the book's publication had ruffled some feathers at Langley." Powers then became a traffic reporting airplane pilot for Los Angeles radio station KGIL.  After that he became a helicopter news reporter for KNBC television.

Death

Powers was piloting a helicopter for Los Angeles TV station KNBC Channel 4 over the San Fernando Valley on August 1, 1977, when the aircraft crashed, killing him and his cameraman George Spears. They had been recording video following brush fires in Santa Barbara County in the KNBC helicopter and were heading back when the crash occurred.

His Bell 206 JetRanger helicopter ran out of fuel and crashed at the Sepulveda Dam recreational area in Encino, California, several miles short of its intended landing site at Burbank Airport. The National Transportation Safety Board report attributed the probable cause of the crash to pilot error. According to Powers's son, an aviation mechanic had repaired a faulty fuel gauge without informing Powers, who subsequently misread it.

At the last moment, it is surmised that he noticed children playing in the area and directed the helicopter elsewhere to avoid landing on them. He might have landed safely if not for the last-second deviation, which compromised his autorotative descent. 
Powers was survived by his wife, children Claudia Dee and Francis Gary Powers Jr., and five sisters. He is buried in Arlington National Cemetery as an Air Force veteran.

Honors

Powers received the CIA's Intelligence Star in 1972 after his return from the Soviet Union. Powers was originally scheduled to receive it in 1963 along with other pilots involved in the CIA's U-2 program, but the award was postponed for political reasons. In 1970, Powers published his first—and only—book review, on a work about aerial reconnaissance, Unarmed and Unafraid by Glenn Infield, in the monthly magazine Business & Commercial Aviation. "The subject has great interest to me," he said, in submitting his review.

In 1998, newly declassified information revealed that Powers's mission had been a joint USAF/CIA operation. In 2000, on the 40th anniversary of the U-2 Incident, his family was presented with his posthumously awarded Prisoner of War Medal, Distinguished Flying Cross, and National Defense Service Medal. In addition, CIA Director George Tenet authorized Powers to posthumously receive the CIA's coveted Director's Medal for extreme fidelity and extraordinary courage in the line of duty.

On June 15, 2012, Powers was posthumously awarded the Silver Star medal for "demonstrating 'exceptional loyalty' while enduring harsh interrogation in the Lubyanka Prison in Moscow for almost two years." Air Force Chief of Staff General Norton Schwartz presented the decoration to Powers's grandchildren, Trey Powers, 9, and Lindsey Berry, 29, in a Pentagon ceremony.

Legacy

Powers's son, Francis Gary Powers Jr., founded the Cold War Museum in 1996. Affiliated with the Smithsonian Institution, it was essentially a traveling exhibit until it found a permanent home in 2011 on a former Army communications base outside Washington, D.C.

In popular culture
 In the 1976 telemovie Francis Gary Powers: The True Story of the U-2 Spy Incident, Powers was played by Lee Majors.
 In 1999, the History Channel aired Mystery of the U2, hosted by Arthur Kent as part of their History Undercover series.  The program was produced by Indigo Films.
 In the 2015 movie Bridge of Spies, dramatizing the negotiations to repatriate Powers, he is portrayed by Austin Stowell, with Tom Hanks starring as negotiator James Donovan.
 In April 2018, The Aviationist featured an article about the song "Powers Down", a tribute to Powers.

Notes

References

 Powers, Francis Gary with Gentry, Curt. Operation Overflight. Hodder & Stoughton Ltd, 1971 (hard cover) .

Further reading
 Khrushchev, Sergei N. Nikita Khrushchev and the Creation of a Superpower. State College, Pennsylvania: Penn State Press, 2000. .
 West, Nigel. Seven Spies Who Changed the World. London: Secker & Warburg, 1992 (hardcover). London: Mandarin, 1992 (paperback).
 The Trial of the U2: Exclusive Authorized Account of the Court Proceedings of the Case of Francis Gary Powers, Heard before the Military Division of the Supreme Court of the U.S.S.R., Moscow, August 17, 18, 19, 1960. Translation World Publishers, Chicago: 1960.

External links

 Family webpage on Gary Powers
 Info on The Cold War Museum
 CIA FOIA documents on Gary Powers
 FBI Records: The Vault – Francis Gary Powers
 Documents and Photographs regarding the U-2 Spy Plane Incident of 1960, Dwight D. Eisenhower Presidential Library 
 Check-Six.com The Francis Gary Powers Helo Crash
 Transcripts of the Soviet court trial 
 1962 Russia frees US spy plane pilot
 View images of the Francis Gary Powers U-2 Pilot Cinderella stamps on the artist's webSite.
 IMDB page for the 1976 TV movie.
 ANC Explorer

1929 births
1977 deaths
American people convicted of spying for the United States
American people imprisoned abroad
American people imprisoned in the Soviet Union
American prisoners of war
American spies against the Soviet Union
Aviators killed in aviation accidents or incidents in the United States
Burials at Arlington National Cemetery
Films about shot-down aviators
Inmates of Vladimir Central Prison
Lockheed people
Milligan University alumni
Military personnel from Kentucky
Military personnel from Virginia
People from Jenkins, Kentucky
People from Pound, Virginia
People of the Central Intelligence Agency
Recipients of the Distinguished Flying Cross (United States)
Recipients of the Intelligence Star
Recipients of the Silver Star
Reconnaissance pilots
Shot-down aviators
United States Air Force officers
Victims of aviation accidents or incidents in 1977
Victims of helicopter accidents or incidents in the United States